Battle for the City is a 2011 Finnish documentary film directed by Jouko Aaltonen about the city of Turku.

References

External links
 

2011 films
2011 documentary films
2010s Finnish-language films
History of Turku
Documentary films about cities
Finnish documentary films